Lucinidae, common name hatchet shells, is a family of saltwater clams, marine bivalve molluscs.

These bivalves are remarkable for their endosymbiosis with sulphide-oxidizing bacteria.

Characteristics
The members of this family have a worldwide distribution. They are found in muddy sand or gravel at or below low tide mark. But they can also be found at bathyal depths. They have characteristically rounded shells with forward-facing projections. The shell is predominantly white and buff and is often thin-shelled. The shells are equivalve with unequal sides. The umbones (the apical part of each valve) are just anterior to mid-line. The adductor scars are unequal: the anterior are narrower and somewhat longer than the posterior. They are partly or largely separated from the pallial line. The valves are flattened and etched with concentric or radial rings. Each valve bears two cardinal and two plate-like lateral teeth. These molluscs do not have siphons but the extremely long foot makes a channel which is then lined with slime and serves for the intake and expulsion of water. The ligament is external and is often deeply inset. The pallial line lacks a sinus.

Fossil record 

Symbiosis 
Lucinids host their sulfur-oxidizing symbionts in specialized gill cells called bacteriocytes. Lucinids are burrowing bivalves that live in environments with sulfide-rich sediments. The bivalve will pump sulfide-rich water over its gills from the inhalant siphon in order to provide symbionts with sulfur and oxygen. The endosymbionts then use these substrates to fix carbon into organic compounds, which are then transferred to the host as nutrients. During periods of starvation, lucinids may harvest and digest their symbionts as food.

Symbionts are acquired via phagocytosis of bacteria by bacterioctyes. Symbiont transmission occurs horizontally, where juvenile lucinids are aposymbiotic and acquire their symbionts from the environment in each generation. Lucinids maintain their symbiont population by reacquiring sulfur-oxidizing bacteria throughout their lifetime. Although process of symbiont acquisition is not entirely characterized, it likely involves the use of the binding protein, codakine, isolated from the lucinid bivalve, Codakia orbicularis. It is also known that symbionts do not replicate within bacteriocytes because of inhibition by the host. However, this mechanism is not well understood.

Lucinid bivalves originated in the Silurian; however, they did not diversify until the late Cretaceous, along with the evolution of seagrass meadows and mangrove swamps. Lucinids were able to colonize these sulfide rich sediments because they already maintained a population of sulfide-oxidizing symbionts. In modern environments, seagrass, lucinid bivalves, and the sulfur-oxidizing symbionts constitute a three-way symbiosis. Because of the lack of oxygen in coastal marine sediments, dense seagrass meadows produce sulfide-rich sediments by trapping organic matter that is later decomposed by sulfate-reducing bacteria. The lucinid-symbiont holobiont removes toxic sulfide from the sediment, and the seagrass roots provide oxygen to the bivalve-symbiont system.

The symbionts from at least two species of lucinid clams, Codakia orbicularis and Loripes lucinalis, are able to fix nitrogen gas into organic nitrogen.

Genera
The following genera are recognised in the family Lucinidae:

Subfamily Codakiinae Iredale, 1937
 Codakia Scopoli, 1777
 Ctena Mörch, 1860
 Divalucina Iredale, 1936
 Epicodakia Iredale, 1930
 Epilucina Dall, 1901
 Lucinoma Dall, 1901
 
Subfamily Fimbriinae Nicol, 1950
 † Cerkesia Monari, 2003 
 † Cyclopellatia Cossmann, 1907 
 Fimbria (traditionally placed in the separate family Fimbriidae)
 † Haastina Marwick, 1953 
 † Mutiella Stoliczka, 1871 
 † Parvicorbis Cossmann, 1892 
 † Schafhaeutlia Cossmann, 1897 
 † Sphaera J. Sowerby, 1822 
 † Sphaeriola Stoliczka, 1871 

Subfamily Leucosphaerinae J. D. Taylor & Glover, 2011
 Afrolucina Cosel, 2006
 Alucinoma Habe, 1958
 Anodontia Link, 1807
 Callucina Dall, 1901
 Dulcina Cosel & Bouchet, 2008
 Epidulcina Cosel & Bouchet, 2008
 Gonimyrtea Marwick, 1929
 Leucosphaera Taylor & Glover, 2005
 Minilucina Cosel & Bouchet, 2008
 Myrtina Glover & Taylor, 2007
 Neophysema J. D. Taylor & Glover, 2005
 Opalocina Glover & J. D. Taylor, 2016
 Pseudolucinisca Chavan, 1959
 † Rawya Strougo, 1975 
 Tinalucina Cosel, 2006
 Ustalucina J. D. Taylor & Glover, 2021

Subfamily Lucininae J. Fleming, 1828
 Austriella Tenison Woods, 1881
 Barbierella Chavan, 1938
 Bathyaustriella Glover, J. D. Taylor & Rowden, 2004
 Bourdotia Dall, 1901
 Bretskya Glover & Taylor, 2007
 Callucinella Chavan, 1961 †
 Cardiolucina
 Cavilinga Chavan, 1937
 Chavania Glover & J. D. Taylor, 2001
 Clathrolucina J. D. Taylor & Glover, 2013
 Discolucina Glover & J. D. Taylor, 2007
 Divalinga Chavan, 1951
 Divaricella von Martens, 1880
 Easmithia Glover & J. D. Taylor, 2016
 Falsolucinoma Cosel, 2006
 Ferrocina Glover & Taylor, 2007
 Funafutia Glover & J. D. Taylor, 2001
 Gibbolucina Cossmann, 1904
 Guyanella J. D. Taylor & Glover, 2016
 Here Gabb, 1866
 Imparilucina J. D. Taylor & Glover, 2021
 Indoaustriella Glover, J. D. Taylor & S. T. Williams, 2008
 Jallenia Glover & J. D. Taylor, 2016
 Joellina Cosel, 2006
 Keletistes P. G. Oliver, 1986
 Lamellolucina J. D. Taylor & Glover, 2002
 Lamylucina Cosel, 2006
 Lepidolucina Glover & Taylor, 2007
 Liralucina Glover & Taylor, 2007
 Loripes Poli, 1791
 Lucina Bruguière, [1797]
 Lucinella Monterosato, 1883
 Lucinisca Dall, 1901
 Megaxinus Brugnone, 1880
 Nevenulora Iredale, 1930
 Notocina J. D. Taylor & Glover, 2019
 Parvidontia Glover & Taylor, 2007
 Parvilucina Dall, 1901
 † Paslucina Olsson, 1964 
 Phacoides Agassiz, 1846
 Pillucina Pilsbry, 1921
 Pleurolucina Dall, 1901
 Plicolucina Glover, J. D. Taylor & Slack-Smith, 2003
 Pompholigina Dall, 1901
 Pusillolucina J. D. Taylor & Glover, 2019
Radiolucina Britton, 1972
 Rasta J. D. Taylor & Glover, 2000
 Rugalucina J. D. Taylor & Glover, 2019
 Scabrilucina J. D. Taylor & Glover, 2013
 Semelilucina Cosel & Bouchet, 2008
 Stewartia Olsson, A. & Harbison, A. 1953
 Troendleina Cosel & Bouchet, 2008
 Wallucina Iredale, 1930

Subfamily Milthinae Chavan, 1969
 Armimiltha Olsson & Harbison, 1953†
 Eomiltha Cossmann, 1912†
 Miltha H. Adams & A. Adams, 1857
 Milthoidea Marwick, 1931†
 Retrolucina J. D. Taylor & Glover, 2018

Subfamily Monitilorinae J. D. Taylor & Glover, 2011
 Monitilora Iredale, 1930
 Prophetilora Iredale, 1930
 
Subfamily Myrteinae Chavan, 1969
 Elliptiolucina Cosel & Bouchet, 2008
 Eulopia Dall, 1901
 † Gardnerella Chavan, 1951
 Gloverina Cosel & Bouchet, 2008
 Graecina Cosel, 2006
 Jorgenia J. D. Taylor & Glover, 2009
 Myrtea Turton, 1822
 Notomyrtea Iredale, 1924
 Rostrilucina Cosel & Bouchet, 2008
 Solelucina Glover & Taylor, 2007
 Taylorina Cosel & Bouchet, 2008
 Tellidorella Berry, 1963

Subfamily Pegophyseminae J. D. Taylor & Glover, 2011
 Afrophysema J. D. Taylor & Glover, 2005
 Bythosphaera J. D. Taylor & Glover, 2005
 Cavatidens Iredale, 1930
 Cryptophysema J. D. Taylor & Glover, 2005
 Euanodontia J. D. Taylor & Glover, 2005
 Loripinus Monterosato, 1883
 Meganodontia Bouchet & Cosel, 2004
 Pegophysema Stewart, 1930
  
Incertae sedis (Subfamily not yet assigned )
 † Amanocina Kiel, 2013 
 † Cavilucina P. Fischer, 1887 
 † Claibornites Stewart, 1930 
 † Cubatea Kiel, 2013 
 † Dilora Marwick, 1948 
 † Eophysema Stewart, 1930 
 † Jagolucina Chavan, 1937 
 † Jagonoma Chavan, 1946 
 † Luciniola Skeat & Madsen, 1898 
 † Mesolinga Chavan, 1951 
 † Mesomiltha Chavan, 1938 
 † Microloripes Cossmann, 1912 
 † Milthona Marwick, 1931 
 † Myrteopsis Sacco, 1901 
 † Nymphalucina Speden, 1970 
 † Pseudomiltha P. Fischer, 1887
 † Pterolucina Chavan, 1942 
 † Pteromyrtea Finlay, 1926 
 † Saxolucina Stewart, 1930 
 † Volupia Defrance, 1829

References

  Stewart, R. B. (1930). Gabb's California Cretaceous and Tertiary type lamellibranchs. Academy of Natural Sciences of Philadelphia, Special Publications. 3: 1-314, pls 1-17.
 Taylor J. & Glover E. (2021). Biology, evolution and generic review of the chemosymbiotic bivalve family Lucinidae. London: The Ray Society [Publication 182]. 319 pp.
 Powell A W B, New Zealand Mollusca, William Collins Publishers Ltd, Auckland, New Zealand 1979 

 
Bivalve families
Taxa named by John Fleming (naturalist)
Extant Silurian first appearances
Chemosynthetic symbiosis